Makarfi is a Local Government Area in Kaduna State, Nigeria. Its headquarters are in the town of Makarfi. The Local Government Council is chaired by Kabir Mayare.

It has an area of 541 km and a population of 146,259 at the 2006 census.

The major economic activity of the Local Government is agriculture.

The postal code of the area is 812.

References

Local Government Areas in Kaduna State